The Thomas Keller Medal is given by the World Rowing Federation (FISA) for an outstanding international career in the sport of rowing. It is the highest honor in rowing and is awarded to any athlete within five years of his/her retirement from the sport. It recognizes an exceptional rowing career as well as exemplary sportsmanship.

It is named after Thomas Keller who was the president of FISA from 1958 until his death in 1989.

Past recipients

References

External links
Thomas Keller Medal – World Rowing Federation

World Rowing Federation
Sports trophies and awards
Awards established in 1990